Typhlomangelia is a genus of sea snails, marine gastropod mollusks in the family Borsoniidae, the cone snails and their allies.

Species
Species within the genus Typhlomangelia include:
 Typhlomangelia adenica Sysoev, 1996
 Typhlomangelia brevicanalis (Shuto, 1983)
 Typhlomangelia cariosa (Watson, 1886)
 Typhlomangelia corona (Laseron, 1954)
 Typhlomangelia fluctuosa (Watson, 1881)
 Typhlomangelia lincta (Watson, 1881)
 † Typhlomangelia magna (Maxwell, 1969)
 Typhlomangelia maldivica Sysoev, 1996
 Typhlomangelia nivalis (Lovén, 1846)
 † Typhlomangelia nodosolirata (Suter, 1917) 
 Typhlomangelia polythele Barnard, 1963
  † Typhlomangelia powelli (Maxwell, 1988)
 Typhlomangelia pyrrha (Watson, 1881)
 † Typhlomangelia vexilliformis (P. Marshall & R. Murdoch, 1923)
Species brought into synonymy
 Typhlomangelia innocentia (Dell, 1990): synonym of Typhlomangelia innocentia Dell, 1990
 Typhlomangelia nivale (Loven, 1846): synonym of Typhlomangelia nivalis (Lovén, 1846)
 Typhlomangelia principalis Thiele, 1912: synonym of Antarctospira principalis (Thiele, 1912) 
 Typhlomangelia tanneri Verrill & S. Smith, 1884: synonym of Retidrillia pruina (Watson, 1881)

References

 Vaught, K.C. (1989). A classification of the living Mollusca. American Malacologists: Melbourne, FL (USA). . XII, 195 pp.
 Gofas, S.; Le Renard, J.; Bouchet, P. (2001). Mollusca, in: Costello, M.J. et al. (Ed.) (2001). European register of marine species: a check-list of the marine species in Europe and a bibliography of guides to their identification. Collection Patrimoines Naturels, 50: pp. 180–213

External links

 Finlay H.J. (1926). New shells from New Zealand Tertiary beds: Part 2. Transactions of the New Zealand Institute. 56: 227-258, pls 55-60
  Bouchet P., Kantor Yu.I., Sysoev A. & Puillandre N. (2011) A new operational classification of the Conoidea. Journal of Molluscan Studies 77: 273-308